New World Syndrome is a set of non-communicable diseases brought on by consumption of junk food and a sedentary lifestyle, especially common to indigenous peoples of the Americas, Oceania, and circumpolar peoples. It is characterized by obesity, heart disease, diabetes, hypertension, and shortened life span.

Causes
New World Syndrome is linked to a change from a traditional diet  and exercise to a Western diet and a sedentary lifestyle. Traditional occupations of indigenous people—such as fishing, farming, and hunting—tended to involve constant activity, whereas modern office jobs do not. The introduction of modern transportation such as automobiles also decreased physical exertion. Meanwhile, Western foods which are rich in fat, salt, sugar, and refined starches are also imported into countries. The amount of carbohydrates in diets increases.

Diagnosis
The diagnosis does not require specific criteria. Obesity is often followed by its complications like hyperlipidemia, hypertension, and cardiac diseases.

See also
 Alcohol and Native Americans
 Diabetes in Indigenous Australians
 Genetics of obesity
 Human genetic variation
 Indigenous health in Australia
 Metabolic syndrome
 Native American health
 Obesity in the Pacific
 Thrifty gene hypothesis

References

External links
 
 
 

Culture-bound syndromes
Health in Greenland
Health in Oceania
Health in North America
Indigenous health
Indigenous health in Canada
Indigenous health in Australia
Medical conditions related to obesity
Modernity
Race and health
Social issues